Alvinlândia is a Brazilian municipality of the state of São Paulo. The population is 3,237 (2020 est.) in an area of 84.9 km².

The municipality contains 20% of the  Caetetus Ecological Station, created in 1976.

References

Municipalities in São Paulo (state)